"Ich ess' Blumen" (also known as "Blumen"; German lit. 'I eat flowers') is a punk song by Die Ärzte.  It was the eighth track and the first single from their 1988 album Das ist nicht die ganze Wahrheit.... The song is an ironic ode to vegetarianism.

This song is referenced in the full title of "Nazareth (Blumen my ass)" from Planet Punk, which is about solving world hunger by eating mucus.

Track listing 

 "Ich ess' Blumen" (Felsenheimer) - 3:44
 "Das ist Rock'n'Roll" (Urlaub, Felsenheimer/Urlaub, Felsenheimer, Liebing) - 3:00

Personnel
Bela B. - vocals, drums
Farin Urlaub - guitar, bass

B-sides
"Das ist Rock'n'Roll" [That's rock'n'roll] is one of many songs from the Gabi & Uwe series.

1988 singles
Die Ärzte songs
Songs written by Bela B.
1988 songs
CBS Records singles